The Cooperation Committee of the Nordic Labour Movement, better known by its abbreviation SAMAK, is an alliance of social democratic parties and labour councils in the Nordic countries. SAMAK consists of all social democratic parties and trade union organisations in the Nordic countries, including in Greenland, the Faroe Islands and Åland. The current President of the Committee as of 2021 is Jonas Gahr Støre, the leader of the Norwegian Labour Party and Prime Minister of Norway. Jan-Erik Støstad is the General Secretary, and Kjersti Stenseng is Chair of the Board.

The committee was formed during the first Scandinavian Workers' Congress in Gothenburg in 1886.

SAMAK holds a congress every four years, while the board meets four to six times per year.

Member organisations

Social Democrats

Danish Trade Union Confederation
Social Democrats

Siumut

Social Democratic Party

Central Organisation of Finnish Trade Unions
Social Democratic Party of Finland

Icelandic Confederation of Labour
Social Democratic Alliance

Labour Party
Norwegian Confederation of Trade Unions

Swedish Social Democratic Party
Swedish Trade Union Confederation

Further reading

 Mirja Österberg. 2019. "‘Norden’ as a Transnational Space in the 1930s: Negotiated Consensus of ‘Nordicness’ in the Nordic Cooperation Committee of the Labour Movement." in Labour, Unions and Politics under the North Star: The Nordic Countries, 1700-2000. Berghahn.

See also
The Social Democratic Group

References

External links
 

Social democratic parties in Europe
Social Democrats (Denmark)
Social Democratic Party of Finland
Nordic organizations
Nordic politics
Scandinavian political parties